Jayjaykar is an Indian Marathi language film directed by Shantanu Rode. The film starring Dilip Prabhawalkar, Suhita Thatte, Sanjay Kulkarni and Bhushan Borgaonkar. Music by Abhijit Joshi. The film was released on 13th June 2014.

Synopsis 
Retired army officer Akhande is a goofy old man notorious among his neighbours for his high jinks. As luck would have it, he ends up bringing about a positive change in the lives of four hijras - Mausi, Rani, Champa and Lajjo.

Cast 
 Dilip Prabhawalkar as Major Akhand 
 Suhita Thatte
 Sanjay Kulkarni as Mausi 
 Bhushan Borgaonkar as Champa 
 Dhawal Pokale as Rani
 Akash Shinde as Lajjo

Soundtrack

Critical response 
Jayjaykar film received positive reviews from critics. A Reviewer of The Times of India gave the film 3 stars out of 5 and wrote "All in all it is a very sensible film that has its heart in place and one that propagates it’s message in a beautiful way without making you feel bad or pitiful about the characters. Definitely worth a watch". Sunil Nandgaonkar of The Indian Express wrote "Rode succeeds in entertaining the audience, as well as in conveying a strong social message through his debut film". A Reviewer of Zee News wrote "The subject has been given special justice due to the accurate selection of artists. Every frame in the film is properly staged". A Reviewer of Divya Marathi  wrote "The skill of the director is reflected in the good subject matter, the appropriate setting. This film is a film that deepens the perspective of the third caste, the skills that are seen around the common man, rather than seeing them as individuals". Soumitra Pote of Maharashtra Times gave the film 3 stars out of 5 and wrote "The director has tried to give a good message in this movie. Only in this entire movie, his newness is seen in the middle. However, all this team has tried to make a good piece of art". Amol Parchure of News18 India wrote "But apart from these things, the movie survives on the strength of acting".

References

External links
 
 

2014 films
2010s Marathi-language films
Indian drama films